In the United States, feeder judges are prominent judges in the American federal judiciary whose law clerks are frequently selected to become law clerks for the justices of the U.S. Supreme Court. Feeder judges are able to place comparatively many of their clerks on the Supreme Court for a variety of reasons, including personal or ideological relationships with particular justices, prestigious and respected positions in the judiciary, and reputations for attracting and training high-quality clerks. Supreme Court clerkships are highly prized and the most difficult to secure in the American clerking landscape—they have been called the "brass ring of law clerk fame" and the "ultimate achievement." Feeder clerkships are, consequently, similarly prized as stepping stones to a potential clerkship with the Supreme Court.

History 

Justices in the early history of the United States Supreme Court hired law clerks straight from law school based on personal recommendations. But over time, applicants to Supreme Court clerk posts began to more often have prior experience, and between 1962 and 2002, 98 percent of Supreme Court clerks had clerked before. As the court began to draw more frequently from prior clerks, particular lower-court judges naturally had more consistent success placing their clerks with the Supreme Court. This phenomenon probably began with Judge Learned Hand, and had been established by the time of Chief Justice Warren Burger in 1969, although data before his tenure is unreliable. Although the phenomenon had thus existed for quite some time, the first published uses of the phrase were in a 1990 article by Judge Patricia Wald and a 1991 article by Judge Alex Kozinski, both feeder judges themselves.

Statistical analysis comparing the feeders of the 1976-1985 and 1995-2004 terms suggests the reliance on feeders has remained consistent since the Burger era, or at most has seen modest growth. However, the feeder system has become more concentrated as more judges are feeding to specific justices than in the past.

Judges 
During the 1969 to 1986 tenure of Chief Justice Warren E. Burger, 85 percent of Supreme Court clerks had previously served on a court of appeals and 12 percent on a district court. For the 1986–2005 William Rehnquist court, these numbers had respectively risen to 92 percent and dropped to 7 percent. Although most feeder judges are therefore court of appeals judges, some district court judges are feeders. Judges Louis H. Pollak and Pierre N. Leval were historically feeders while on the district court, and district Judge Jed S. Rakoff is essentially a feeder since he co-hires clerks with appellate feeder Judge Robert Katzmann.

Various factors affect which judges become feeders. Ideological alignment with justices is usually an important factor, and conservative feeder judges place more clerks with conservative justices and vice versa. In fact, feeder judges are notorious for being on the extremes of the judicial spectrum, with comparatively few ideologically moderate feeder judges.

For some, the reputation as a feeder judge is a draw. "It's a little bit of a prestige matter," Kozinski has remarked. Being regarded as a feeder can be a way to stand out among the ranks of courts of appeals judges. Indeed, many feeder judges cherish this status so much they modulate their own clerkship hiring based on an applicant's compatibility with the justices, and pass over promising clerks because they are doubtful of the applicant's chances of securing a Supreme Court clerkship. Additionally, because feeder clerkships are themselves so highly desired, the judges benefit by being able to hire some the most talented of the clerkship applicant pool in a given year.

Some judges have an edge placing clerks with justices for whom they themselves were once clerks. Judge Michael Luttig, for example, clerked for Justice Antonin Scalia while Scalia was on the D.C. Circuit, and Luttig placed three-quarters of his clerks with Scalia or Justice Clarence Thomas. Kozinski clerked for Justice Anthony Kennedy, and of the 15 clerks he placed on the court between 1995 and 2004, eight were with Kennedy. Beyond connections to particular justices, the D.C. Circuit is regarded a feeder circuit to the entire court, due partially to the simple fact that justices live, work and socialize with those judges in Washington, D.C. as well as being a prestigious circuit in its own right.

Feeder judges

See also 
Lists of law clerks of the Supreme Court of the United States

References

External links  
Above the Law articles about feeder judges

Law clerks of the Supreme Court of the United States
Supreme Court of the United States